Sin Island is a 2018 Philippine erotic thriller film directed by Gino M. Santos, and starring Xian Lim, Coleen Garcia and Nathalie Hart. In the story, David (Lim) and Kanika (Garcia) are happily married, until Kanika's adulterous affair ruins their relationship, prompting David to start his own affair with Tasha (Hart). The film was released on February 14, 2018.

Plot

David (Xian Lim), a photographer, has been married to his flight attendant wife Kanika (Coleen Garcia) for two years, and they live an intimate life as a couple. One day, though, David catches Kanika cheating on him with her co-worker (TJ Trinidad), and spends some time apart from his wife by going to Sin Island (short for Sinilaban Island). At the beach, David sees a tattooed woman named Tasha (Nathalie Hart), a fashion designer who is practicing her yoga, and the two begin an affair. Meanwhile, Kanika decides to repair her relationship with David, but finds herself in conflict with Tasha, who has eventually become his mistress.

Cast

Main

Supporting

Theme
Jancy Nicolas, the screenwriter of Sin Island, elaborated on the film's theme of "fighting for love": "It really talks about redeeming love, redeeming a marriage, and fighting for it. More than yung edge niya (its edge), more than yung darkness niya (its darkness), it's really fundamentally a story of a marriage."

Reception
Writing for Rappler, Oggs Cruz called Sin Island "very watchable" despite its flaws concerning the "tame" sex scenes as well as the "blatant illogic," incoherent plot. Philbert Dy, film critic for The Neighborhood who scored the film 0.5 out of 5, compared Sin Island to "children playing at being adults," and criticized its "subpar" production values, mediocre acting, and "poorly staged sex and violence".

References

External links
 

2010s erotic thriller films
Philippine erotic thriller films
Adultery in films
Films set on fictional islands
Star Cinema films